Ingrid Kristina Wallgren (née Ingrid Apelgren; 3 May 1923 – 6 February 2016) was a Swedish sprint canoeist who competed in the late 1940s and the early 1950s. She won a bronze medal in the K-2 500 m event at the 1950 ICF Canoe Sprint World Championships in Copenhagen. She was eliminated in the heats of the K-1 500 m event at the 1948 Summer Olympics in London. Wallgren died in February 2016 at the age of 92.

References

Ingrid Wallgren's profile at Sports Reference.com

1923 births
2016 deaths
Canoeists at the 1948 Summer Olympics
ICF Canoe Sprint World Championships medalists in kayak
Olympic canoeists of Sweden
Swedish female canoeists